The Candidate Physical Ability Test (CPAT) is the standard assessment for measuring an individual's ability to handle the physical demands of being a firefighter. The CPAT is a timed test that measures how candidates handle eight separate physical tasks or functions, designed to mirror tasks that firefighters would have to do on the job.

Details 
During the test, candidates are required to complete 8 separate tasks in a period of 10 minutes and 20 seconds. The tasks are the following:

 Stair Climb  (climbing stairs while carrying an additional 25 pound simulated hose pack)
 Hose Drag (stretching uncharged hose lines, advancing lines)
 Equipment Carry (removing and carrying equipment from fire apparatus to fire ground)
 Ladder Raise and Extension (placing a ground ladder at the fire scene and extending the ladder to the roof or a window)
 Forcible Entry (penetrating a locked door, breaching a wall)
 Search (crawling through dark unpredictable areas to search for victims)
 Rescue Drag (removing a victim or partner from a burning building)
 Ceiling Breach and Pull (locating a fire and checking for fire extension)

During the test, candidates are required wear a helmet, gloves and a 50 pound weighted vest. This is designed to simulate the weight of a firefighter's personal protective equipment. For the stair climb, candidates are required to carry an additional 25 pounds of weight, which simulates the carrying of a hose pack into a high rise fire. Candidates are accompanied by a test proctor, who calls out directions for the test events and scores the candidate's success. Each event of the CPAT must be completed as directed. If a candidate fails any component of the test or does not complete the test within the 10 minute and 20 second time limit, they will fail the entire test.

See also 

 United States Army Physical Fitness Test

References

External links 

 CPAT Orientation Video
 CPAT Frequently Asked Questions

Fitness tests
Firefighters